Don Hummel (September 8, 1907 – August 18, 1988) was an American businessman and politician. Don Hummel served as the mayor of Tucson, Arizona from 1955 through 1961, where he is remembered for pushing an aggressive annexation program that helped encourage the city's rapid growth. He also served as Assistant Secretary of the United States Department of Housing and Urban Development during the administration of President Lyndon B. Johnson.

Hummel was also a concessionaire for the National Park Service, owning and operating hotels, guest cabins and other visitor services in  Glacier National Park, Lassen Volcanic National Park, and Mount McKinley National Park.

He was the author of two published books, Stealing the National Parks (1987) and One Man's Life (1988).

References 

1907 births
1988 deaths
Glacier National Park (U.S.)
Mayors of Tucson, Arizona
20th-century American politicians